Werder Bremen has had 24 managers since the beginning of the Bundesliga era in 1963. Otto Rehhagel served the longest term, being in office for fourteen years. Hans Tilkowski, Willi Multhaup, Rudi Assauer, and Otto Rehhagel served two terms each while Fritz Langner served three.

Pre-Bundesliga era

Coaching statistics

Trophies won statistics

Bundesliga era

Coaching statistics

Trophies won statistics

References

Managers
 
Lists of football managers by club in Germany